Gilbert Mackenzie Trench (1885–1979) was a Scottish architect, and the Architect Surveyor to the Metropolitan Police. He is credited as the designer of the iconic Police Telephone Box which has since become a pop culture icon owing to its immortalisation as the space-time machine of Doctor Who. Information is sparse about him, as he is known mostly for the Police box.

Other buildings he is known to have designed include the police station and associated accommodation in Tooting in south London. Trench also designed Charles Rowan House on Margery Street, Clerkenwell, which was built in the 1920s as married quarters for Metropolitan policemen.

Early life 
Mackenzie Trench was born on 4 April 1885 in East Dulwich. He was one of five children and the eldest of two sons to the Scottish civil engineer, Gilbert Kennedy Campbell Trench (1855–1937), and his wife Clementina  Flett (1857–1938). Mackenzie Trench's younger brother, Alexander, later became an engineer, associated with the office of Babcock & Wilcox.

Police Box 
In 1928, Trench was commissioned by the Metropolitan Police to design a new Police Box, able to not only take calls from public notifying the police force of a crime, but to also allow a "Bobby On The Beat" to sit inside and make himself a cup of tea whilst he waited for a call-out. It began its installation in 1929, with demonstrations at the 1936 Radio Show. The boxes saw much use over the next 40 years, doubling as air raid sirens in WW2. By 1969, however, walkie-talkies and quick response vehicles such as the Ford Zephyr had made it redundant, and the home secretary James Callaghan had nearly all of them demolished. As of present, only 11 remain of the over 1000 originally constructed. It was immortalised in the British TV show Doctor Who after it became the disguise for the titular character's space-time machine, The TARDIS.

Personal life
Mackenzie Trench married Dorothy Olare Buswell Booth on 31 August 1912 at the Church of Emmanuel, East Dulwich. Trench fathered two children, Jean Doris Trench (1913–2008) and Kenneth Mackenzie Trench (1923 –1923). He died in 1979 in Wanganui, New Zealand.

References 

1885 births
1979 deaths
People from East Dulwich
British designers
20th-century Scottish architects